The discography of German singer Jasmin Wagner, best known as Blümchen, also known as Jasmin, Blossom or Denim Girl, consists of six studio albums, one soundtrack album, one live album, two remix albums, three compilation albums, two video albums, 30 singles, including five as featured artist, seven promotional singles, and 30 music videos, including tree as featured artist. The first release was the debut studio album Herzfrequenz in 1996, preceded by the chart hit "Herz an Herz", a Paso Doble cover version. The albums Verliebt..., Jasmin, Die Welt gehört dir and Die Versuchung followed in 1997, 1998, 2000 and 2006 respectively. In 2019, after a hiatus, Wagner returned as Blümchen and released her first single "Computerliebe", again a Paso Doble cover version.

Albums

Studio albums

Soundtrack albums

Live albums

Remix albums

Compilation albums

Singles

As lead artist

As featured artist

Promotional singles

Other appearances

Video albums

Music videos

Featured music videos

Notes

References

Discographies of German artists